The Open Championship is an annual golf competition held in the United Kingdom that was established in 1860. It is played on the weekend of the third Friday in July, and is the last of the four major championships to be played each year. In addition, this championship is conducted by The Royal and Ancient Golf Club of St Andrews (R&A). The championship was not held in 1871 due to a disagreement over a new trophy, from 1915 to 1919 and from 1940 to 1945 due to the First and Second World Wars respectively, and in 2020 due to the COVID-19 pandemic.

The reigning champion of the competition is automatically invited to play in the other three majors (Masters, the U.S. Open, and the PGA Championship) for the next five years. The prize of the tournament is the Golf Champion Trophy, commonly known as the Claret Jug, and the champion personally keeps the trophy until the next competition the following year. The champion also receives a gold medal, which they are allowed to keep permanently. Until 1870 the champion received the Challenge Belt, however when Tom Morris Jr. (more commonly known as Young Tom Morris) won the Open Championship three times in a row he won the belt outright, necessitating the need for a new trophy.

Harry Vardon holds the record for the most Open Championship victories, winning six times during his career. The oldest winner of the Open Championship is Tom Morris Sr. (or Old Tom Morris) who was  old when he won in 1867. His son, Tom Morris Jr., is the youngest winner of the championship, he was  old when he won the 1868 Open Championship. He also won the most consecutive times with four victories (1868–1872). Henrik Stenson and Cameron Smith hold the distinction of being both the most strokes under par for 72 holes (−20), which they achieved in 2016 and 2022 respectively. Stenson also recorded the lowest total score (264) when he won in 2016. Smith is the current champion, winning the 2022 Open.

Champions

By year

Multiple champions

By nationality

Notes

References

Bibliography

External links
The Open Championship official site
R&A website

List
Open Champ